Edward Stuart Davis (December 7, 1892 – June 24, 1964), was an early American modernist painter. He was well known for his jazz-influenced, proto-pop art paintings of the 1940s and 1950s, bold, brash, and colorful, as well as his Ashcan School pictures in the early years of the 20th century.  With the belief that his work could influence the sociopolitical environment of America, Davis' political message was apparent in all of his pieces from the most abstract to the clearest. Contrary to most modernist artists, Davis was aware of his political objectives and allegiances and did not waver in loyalty via artwork during the course of his career. By the 1930s, Davis was already a famous American painter, but that did not save him from feeling the negative effects of the Great Depression, which led to his being one of the first artists to apply for the Federal Art Project. Under the project, Davis created some seemingly Marxist works; however, he was too independent to fully support Marxist ideals and philosophies.

Life and career 

Davis was born Edward Stuart Davis on December 7, 1892, in Philadelphia to Edward Wyatt Davis, art editor of The Philadelphia Press, and Helen Stuart Davis, sculptor. In 1909 he entered the Orange High School, but during his first year he dropped out and began commuting to New York City. Davis began his formal art training under Robert Henri, the leader of the Ashcan School, at the Robert Henri School of Art in New York under 1912. During this time, Davis befriended painters John Sloan, Glenn Coleman and Henry Glintenkamp.

In 1913, Davis was one of the youngest painters to exhibit in the Armory Show, where he displayed five watercolor paintings in the Ashcan school style.
In the show, Davis was exposed to the works of a number of artists including Vincent van Gogh, Henri Matisse, and Pablo Picasso. Davis became a committed "modern" artist and a major exponent of cubism and modernism in America. He spent summers painting in Gloucester, Massachusetts, and made painting trips to Havana in 1918 and New Mexico in 1923.

After spending several years emulating artists in the Armory Show, Davis started moving toward a signature style with his 1919 Self-Portrait, in the collection of the Amon Carter Museum of American Art. In the 1920s he began his development into his mature style; painting abstract still lifes and landscapes. His use of contemporary subject matter such as cigarette packages and spark plug advertisements suggests a proto-pop art element to his work.  Among Davis' practices was his use of previous paintings.
Elements of harbor scenes he painted in Gloucester, Massachusetts can be found in a number of subsequent works.  Another practice was painting series, works with similar structures, but with altered colors or added geometric embellishments, essentially creating variations on a theme.  Some commentators suggest that this aspect of his work parallels his love of jazz in which a basic chord structure is improvised upon by the musicians.

In 1928, he visited Paris, France for a year, where he painted street scenes. In 1929, while in Paris, he married his American girlfriend, Bessie Chosak. In the 1930s, he became increasingly politically engaged; according to Cécile Whiting, Davis' goal was to "reconcile abstract art with Marxism and modern industrial society". In 1934 he joined the Artists' Union; he was later elected its President. In 1936 the American Artists' Congress elected him National Secretary. He painted murals for Federal Art Project of the Works Progress Administration that are influenced by his love of jazz.

In 1932 Davis was devastated by the loss of his wife, Bessie Chosak Davis, who died after complications from a botched abortion. Also in 1932, Davis executed a mural commission for Radio City Music Hall which the Rockefeller Center Art Committee named "Men Without Women" (after Ernest Hemingway's second collection of short stories completed the same year).  According to Hilton Kramer in a 1975 piece on the work in the New York Times, Davis was happy neither with the location in which the mural was placed nor with the title it was given.

In 1938, Davis painted Swing Landscape, a modernist mural now considered one of the most important American paintings in the 20th-century. That same year, Davis married Roselle Springer. Davis spent his late life teaching at the New York School for Social Research and at Yale University.

Along with his paintings, Davis was also a printmaker and was a member of the Society of American Graphic Artists.

From 1945–1951, Davis worked on The Mellow Pad, an abstract work inspired by jazz music.

In 1947–52, two works by Davis, For internal use only (1945) and Composition (1863) (c. 1930) were featured in the Painting toward architecture crossover art and design exhibition, in 28 venues.

He was represented by Edith Gregor Halpert at the Downtown Gallery in New York City.

One of his last paintings, Blips and Ifs, created between 1963 and 1964, is in the collection of the Amon Carter Museum of American Art.

In 1964, the U.S. Postal Service issued a stamp featuring Davis'  'Detail Study for Cliche'.

Davis died of a stroke in New York on June 24, 1964, aged 71.

Mentors 
Davis was first professionally trained by Robert Henri, an American realist. Henri began teaching Davis in 1909. Henri did not look highly upon American art institutions at the time, which led to him joining John Sloan and six other anti-institutional artists (known as "the Eight") to put on an exhibit at the Macbeth Gallery in 1908. Through his vocal rejection of academic norms in painting, Henri encouraged Davis and his other students to find new forms and ways to express their art and to draw on their daily lives for inspiration.

Inspirations 
Ideologies prevalent during the Progressive Era led to the young Stuart Davis feeling a great sense of pride in being American, which led to his creating several works centered on a "Great America". After his training with Henri, Davis would walk around the streets of New York City for inspiration for his works. His time amongst the public caused him to develop a strong social conscience which was strengthened through his friendship with John Sloan, another anti-institutional artist. Additionally, Davis frequented the 1913 Armory Show (in which he exhibited his work), to further educate himself on modernism and its evolving trends. Davis acquired an appreciation and knowledge of how to implement the formal and color advancements of European modernism, something Henri did not focus on, to his art. In 1925, the Société Anonyme put on an exhibit in New York with several pieces by the French artist Fernand Léger. Davis had a large amount of respect for Léger because like Davis, Léger sought the utmost formal clarity in his work. Davis also appreciated Léger's work for the subject matter: storefronts, billboard and other man-made objects.

Public collections
Among the public collections holding work by Stuart Davis are:

Addison Gallery of American Art (Andover, Massachusetts)
Amon Carter Museum of American Art (Texas)
Art Gallery of the University of Rochester (New York)
Art Institute of Chicago
Block Museum of Art (Northwestern University, Illinois)
Brooklyn Museum (New York City)
Carnegie Museums of Pittsburgh (Pittsburgh, Pennsylvania)
Cleveland Museum of Art
Crystal Bridges Museum of American Art (Arkansas)
Currier Museum of Art (New Hampshire)
Dallas Museum of Art (Texas)
Dayton Art Institute (Ohio)
Fine Arts Museums of San Francisco
Robert Hull Fleming Museum (University of Vermont)
Fred Jones Jr. Museum of Art (University of Oklahoma)
Harvard University Art Museums
Hirshhorn Museum and Sculpture Garden (Washington, D.C.)
Honolulu Museum of Art
the Hyde Collection (Glens Falls, New York)
Indiana University Art Museum (Bloomington, Indiana)
Johnson Museum of Art (Cornell University, Ithaca, New York)
Krannert Art Museum (University of Illinois at Urbana-Champaign, Champaign, Illinois)
Kemper Museum of Contemporary Art (Kansas City, Missouri)
Maier Museum of Art (Randolph-Macon Woman's College, Virginia)
Metropolitan Museum of Art
Mint Museum (Charlotte, NC)
Montclair Art Museum (New Jersey)
Munson-Williams-Proctor Arts Institute (Utica, New York)
Museum of Fine Arts, Houston (Texas)
Museum of Modern Art (New York City)

National Gallery of Australia (Canberra)
National Portrait Gallery (Washington, D.C.)
Nelson-Atkins Museum of Art (Kansas City, Missouri)
Nevada Museum of Art
Norton Museum of Art (West Palm Beach, Florida)
Oklahoma City Museum of Art (Oklahoma)
Orange County Museum of Art (Newport Beach, California)
Palazzo Ruspoli (Rome)
Pennsylvania Academy of the Fine Arts (Philadelphia)
The Phillips Collection (Washington, D.C.)
Pierpont Morgan Library (New York City)
Pomona College Museum of Art (California)
Portland Museum of Art (Maine)
San Diego Museum of Art (California)
San Francisco Museum of Modern Art (San Francisco, California)
Sheldon Art Gallery (Lincoln, Nebraska)
Smithsonian American Art Museum (Washington, D.C.)
Springfield Museum of Art (Ohio)
Tacoma Art Museum (Washington)
Thyssen-Bornemisza Museum (Madrid)
U.S. Library of Congress (Washington, D.C.)
University of Kentucky Art Museum
Virginia Museum of Fine Arts (Richmond)
Wadsworth Atheneum (Hartford)
Walker Art Center (Minnesota)
Westmoreland Museum of American Art (Greensburg, Pennsylvania)
Whitney Museum of American Art (New York City)
Yale University Art Gallery (Connecticut)

Selected works

See also
Precisionism
The Masses
 The Liberator
New Masses

References and sources
References

Sources

 2007 – Stuart Davis: A Catalogue Raisonné (3 volumes) by William Agee (Editor), Karen Wilkin, (Editor), Ani Boyajian, Mark Rutkoski
 
Lowery Stokes Sims et al., Stuart Davis: American Painter, 333 pages, 129 color illus., The Metropolitan Museum of Art and Harry N. Abrams, Inc. 1991.
Karen Wilkin 1999 - Stuart Davis in Gloucester

External links

 Stuart Davis Artwork Examples on AskART.
 Stuart Davis Artwork Examples on ibiblio's WebMuseum.
 Comrades in Art:  Stuart Davis
 Stuart Davis' Swing Landscape
 "STUART DAVIS: IN FULL SWING" retrospective at the Whitney Museum June 10 – Sept 25 2016,
 Blips and Ifs (1963–1964), a painting in the collection of the Amon Carter Museum of American Art
 Self-Portrait (1919), a painting in the collection of the Amon Carter Museum of American Art

1892 births
1964 deaths
Artists from Philadelphia
20th-century American painters
American male painters
Modern painters
Precisionism
Students of Robert Henri
Art Students League of New York faculty
Painters from Pennsylvania
Federal Art Project artists
20th-century American printmakers
Burials at Green River Cemetery
20th-century American male artists
Members of the American Academy of Arts and Letters